The 1943–44 AHL season was the eighth season of the American Hockey League. Six teams played in a 54 game schedule. The Cleveland Barons won the F. G. "Teddy" Oke Trophy as the Western Division champions, while the Buffalo Bisons won their second consecutive Calder Cup.

Team changes
 The Washington Lions cease operations.
 The Buffalo Bisons switch divisions from West to East.

Final standings
Note: GP = Games played; W = Wins; L = Losses; T = Ties; GF = Goals for; GA = Goals against; Pts = Points;

†The final two regular season games between Providence and Pittsburgh had no effect in the standings, and were cancelled.

Scoring leaders

Note: GP = Games played; G = Goals; A = Assists; Pts = Points; PIM = Penalty minutes

 complete list

Calder Cup playoffs

See also
List of AHL seasons

References
AHL official site
AHL Hall of Fame
HockeyDB

American Hockey League seasons
2